The 1958 World Sportscar Championship was a motor racing series for sportscars which ran from 26 January to 13 September 1958 and comprised six races in six countries. It was the sixth World Sportscar Championship.

The championship was won by Ferrari.

Season

After major accidents at the 1955 Les 24 Heures du Mans and 1957 Mille Miglia, the sport’s governing body, F.I.A. and its Commission Sportive Internationale (CSI) dictated several technical changes to the 1958 Sports Car regulations with engine capacity now limited to three litres. Although Le Mans continued, the Mille Miglia was never run in its original format again and was dropped from the calendar, with the Sicilian Targa Florio replacing it as the Italian round of the championship.

This allowed Scuderia Ferrari to dominate the season, as Maserati withdrew from motor racing, leaving Aston Martin and Porsche as the main opposition, but as the previous seasons, the majority of the fields were made up of amateur or gentlemen drivers, often up against professional racing drivers with experience in Formula One.

Season results

Race results

Championship standings

The cars
The following models contributed to the net championship point scores of their respective manufacturers.
 Ferrari 250 TR 58
 Porsche 718 RSK & Porsche 550A RS
 Aston Martin DBR1/300 & Aston Martin DB3S
 Lotus Eleven
 Osca S1500

References

External links
 1958 World Sportscar Championship race results, www.classicscars.com
 1958 World Sportscar Championship points table, www.classicscars.com

 
World Sportscar Championship seasons
World